El Jadida Airport  was an airport serving the city of El Jadida, Morocco.

Google Earth Historical Imagery from 4/28/2002 shows a  grass runway 04/22.  07/13/2005 image shows a highway cut through, and the current satellite image shows the area covered with streets and apartment blocks.

The surface of the airport measured 92ha and was transformed in 2008 into a real-estate development project by the firm CGI (subsidiary of the CDG fund) and a Marjane hypermarket was opened there in 2013.

See also
Transport in Morocco
List of airports in Morocco

References

External links
OpenStreetMap - El Jadida Airport - closed

 Google Earth

Airports in Morocco
Defunct airports in Morocco